The Ceiling is a short story by American writer Kevin Brockmeier that won the O. Henry Award in 2002.  It previously appeared in McSweeney's Number 7.

References

External links
 The Ceiling book entry at Random House publishers.

2001 short stories
American short stories
Works originally published in Timothy McSweeney's Quarterly Concern